is a 2009 Japanese exploitation horror film written and directed by Kōji Shiraishi.

Plot
A young couple, Aki Miyasita and Kazuo Kojima, are snatched off the street while having their first date. They wake up shackled in a basement that has plastic-covered walls. A sadistic madman degrades, tortures, and mutilates them with no further explanation. He punctures Kazuo's belly with a screwdriver, slices his tongue, and drives nails into his scrotum. He sexually assaults both the man and woman, forcing the other to watch. Sometimes, he stops the torture to provide medical assistance and treat the couple's wounds, so they can continue to live for a longer period of time. He cuts off all their fingers, makes collars with them, pops out Kazuo's right eye, removes the girl's nipples, and cuts off her right arm.

As the torture progresses, it is revealed he is simply doing it for sexual stimulation. He finally castrates Kazuo, claiming he has found all the sexual relief he needs so no longer needs the couple's "services". The couple is moved to a room that resembles a modern and clean hospital room, where the kidnapper takes care of their wounds. It gradually becomes apparent that the man has professional medical training, refined manners, and fine taste, preferring classical music, good wine, and expensive clothes. He mentions he is wealthy, suggesting he may be a reputable surgeon, not merely a violent sadist, looking for an extreme way to obtain satisfaction in his lonely life. The couple notes that the doctor has a particular rotting smell behind his clean and elegant appearance.

After several days of healing, the "doctor" simply tells the couple they will be free to go. He will turn himself in, and, as an apology for all the suffering he inflicted, he will give them his entire fortune as compensation. In a moment alone, Aki and Kazuo promise to support each other once they leave and stay together. However, immediately after telling them they will be released, the couple is taken back to the basement and are shackled again, just like before.
 
The "doctor" announces they must participate in one final test of love. He pulls out some of Kazuo's intestines and attaches them to a hook. If Kazuo can cross the room to the other side (pulling his entire intestine out of his body in the process) and cut Aki's ropes with scissors to release her, both will be freed. However, Kazuo fails due to blood loss, and it is revealed that the ropes restraining Aki have a metal wire running through them; the task was therefore impossible regardless.

Aki begins to insult the doctor, saying he has a skunk odor. Angered, the doctor cuts off her head. The head lands on the doctor's neck; she bites him with her final breath. Kazuo, not dead yet, stabs him in the foot with the scissors as his supreme last action. The couple dies facing each other. In the epilogue, the madman is revealed to have survived, although he cannot walk properly. He respectfully buries the couple next to each other in a quiet forest the traditional Japanese way, leaving the scissors on their tombs as a symbol. The next scene shows him in his car again, covering himself with much perfume to hide his skunk stench. A girl walks by, and the screen cuts as he goes after his next victim.

Cast
 Tsugumi Nagasawa as Aki Miyasita
 Hiroaki Kawatsure as Kazuo Kojima
 Shigeo Ōsako as the unnamed doctor

Release
The British Board of Film Classification has refused to issue an 18 certificate to the unrated version of the film, banning its release in the United Kingdom. BBFC director David Cook explained "Unlike other recent 'torture' themed horror works, such as the Saw and Hostel series, Grotesque features minimal narrative or character development and presents the audience with little more than an unrelenting and escalating scenario of humiliation, brutality and sadism. In spite of a vestigial attempt to 'explain' the killer's motivations at the very end of the film, the chief pleasure on offer is not related to understanding the motivations of any of the central characters. Rather, the chief pleasure on offer seems to be wallowing in the spectacle of sadism (including sexual sadism) for its own sake".

The film's director and screenwriter, Koji Shiraishi, responded that he was "delighted and flattered by this most expected reaction from the faraway country, since the film is an honest conscientious work, made sure to upset the so-called moralists."

Home media
The reception in Japan was initially less controversial, but after the notoriety of the UK ban, Amazon Japan decided to remove the DVD of Grotesque from its website. Of note is that CDJapan, the international version of the Japanese retailer Neowing, does not sell the DVD since the controversy; although it is still readily available to Japanese residents via Neowing.

The film was released on DVD in Austria and the Netherlands on July 31. The DVD is a special edition limited to 1,000 copies. The DVD only contains German and Japanese language tracks and is only available in online stores related to the genre.
 
The film was released on a DVD/Blu-ray in the United States by Media Blasters on October 12, 2010.

Reception 

Derek Elley of Variety had a lukewarm response to Grotesque, offering kudos to aspects such as the acting and the production values, while criticizing others such as the inconsistent special effects, and opining that the "ridiculous" finale "blows any built-up tension and generates chuckles more than anything else". Horror News praised the film, opening its review with, "Grotesque is really a mix of emotions. Brilliant, disgusting, well written, sadistic and painful to your senses beyond belief" and concluding that it was "a solid effort" that deserves "an A for a great and outrageous ending".

See also

 List of banned films

References

External links
 
 

2009 films
2009 horror films
Japanese horror films
2000s Japanese-language films
Japanese independent films
Film controversies in Japan
Film censorship in Japan
Film controversies in the United Kingdom
Film censorship in the United Kingdom
Censored films
Film controversies
Obscenity controversies in film
Films directed by Kōji Shiraishi
Japanese splatter films
Films about death
2000s Japanese films